Frederick Kirby (born 1891) was an English amateur footballer who played as a forward for Sunderland.

References

1891 births
Sportspeople from Bishop Auckland
Footballers from County Durham
English footballers
Association football forwards
Bishop Auckland F.C. players
Sunderland A.F.C. players
Durham City A.F.C. players
Middlesbrough F.C. players
Halifax Town A.F.C. players
Bradford (Park Avenue) A.F.C. players
English Football League players
Year of death missing